Rue Saint-Paul may refer to: 
 Rue Saint-Paul (Montreal)
 Rue Saint-Paul (Paris)

See also 
 St. Paul Street

Odonyms referring to religion